The Texas 500 was a NASCAR Winston Cup Series stock car race held at Texas World Speedway in 1969, 1971, and 1972.

Past winners

Multiple winners (manufacturers)

References

External links
 

NASCAR races at Texas World Speedway